Woman Travels Alone is the third studio album by Swedish singer-songwriter Edda Magnason. released in 26 November 2014 by Parlophone.

Track listing 
"Hombre I Know" – 2:00
"Tell" – 1:53
"Game of Gain" – 3:29
"Great Simple Mind" – 2:09
"Lingering Girl" – 3:21
"Cocoamber" – 4:20
"Polar Bear" – 3:55
"Bloom" – 3:50
"Anchor" – 3:07
"Hurry Water" – 3:22
"Dare Devil" – 3:20

References

2014 albums
Edda Magnason albums